The Dakataua Caldera is located at the northern tip of the Willaumez Peninsula, New Britain, Papua New Guinea. The peninsula includes the 350 m high andesitic Mount Makalia stratovolcano. The last major collapse of Dakataua was during the Holocene around 800 CE. The most recent eruption on the caldera's rim was Mount Makalia in 1890, producing lava flows and cinder cones.

Caldera lake 
Dakataua caldera lake is about 76 m above sea level, has total  surface area , and the maximum depth  approximately 120 m. It is horseshoe shaped, roughly bisected by a peninsula. It is a freshwater lake that is alkaline with a pH of up to 8.2. It is presumed to be formed by rainwater gradually filling in the caldera. While the lake supports various kinds of life, it does not support any species of fish.

Migo the Lake Monster 
There is a folk legend that a monster called the migo (or masali) inhabits the lake. In 1993 a Japanese film crew led by Tetsuo Nagata captured what they claimed to be the migo on film. It is presumed that the creature in the video is actually a saltwater crocodile from the ocean surrounding the lake.

References

Volcanoes of New Britain
Stratovolcanoes of Papua New Guinea
VEI-6 volcanoes
Holocene stratovolcanoes